Postsee is a lake in Kreis Plön, Schleswig-Holstein, Germany. At an elevation of 20.6 m, its surface area is 276.4 ha.

Lakes of Schleswig-Holstein